Mu Sigma is an American decision sciences firm that primarily offers data analytics services. The firm's name is derived from the statistical terms "Mu (μ)" and "Sigma (σ)" which symbolize the mean and the standard deviation, respectively, of a probability distribution.

History 
Mu Sigma was founded by Dhiraj Rajaram, a former strategy consultant at Booz Allen Hamilton and PricewaterhouseCoopers, in 2004.
In 2008, Mu Sigma raised its first institutional investment round of $30 million from FTVentures (now FTV Capital). In April 2011, the company raised an additional $25 million from Sequoia Capital. In December 2011, the company announced a $108 million round of financing from Sequoia and growth equity investor General Atlantic. In February 2013, Mu Sigma received an investment of $45 million from MasterCard, which placed the company over the $1 billion (Rs. 5,400 crore) milestone.

In early 2016, the company was sued by Aon Corp founder Pat Ryan, who discussed that Mu Sigma lowballed its own growth prospects in order to buy back Ryan's stake in the company.

In October 2016, after the divorce of Ambiga Subramanian, who was serving as CEO at the time, Dhiraj Rajaram assumed the role of CEO.

Locations 
Mu Sigma is headquartered in Chicago, Illinois and has a global delivery centre in Bangalore. It also has an office in Austin, Texas.

Recognition

Mu Sigma was ranked #907 on the 2012 Inc. 5000 list of America's fastest-growing private companies. In 2011 the company ranked #386, and in 2010, it ranked #204.

References

Notes

External links

Analytics companies
Technology companies established in 2004